General Winfield Scott Hancock is an equestrian statue of Winfield Scott Hancock, by Henry Jackson Ellicott together with architect Paul J. Pelz.
It is located at Pennsylvania Avenue in United States Navy Memorial Park at the northwest corner of 7th Street, Northwest, Washington, D.C.

It was commissioned on March 2, 1889, and dedicated on May 12, 1896, by president Grover Cleveland. It cost $50,000.

The statue is a contributing monument to the Civil War Monuments in Washington, DC, of the National Register of Historic Places.

The statue is featured in the opening of the Netflix series House of Cards.

See also
 List of public art in Washington, D.C., Ward 6

References

External links
 
https://www.flickr.com/photos/wallyg/3889791695/
http://www.waymarking.com/waymarks/WM2GZ1
http://www.waymarking.com/waymarks/WM81Q7
http://www.dcmemorials.com/index_indiv0000560.htm

External links
 

Equestrian statues in Washington, D.C.
1896 sculptures
Bronze sculptures in Washington, D.C.
Historic district contributing properties in Washington, D.C.
Hancock
Outdoor sculptures in Washington, D.C.
Sculptures of men in Washington, D.C.
Penn Quarter